The Casa Real de Iloilo (Royal House of Iloilo), also known as the Old Iloilo Provincial Capitol, was the residence of the alcalde-mayor, or governor, then the highest Spanish official in Iloilo, Philippines. It is located on General Luna Street in Iloilo City. The National Historical Institute (NHI) formally recognized the Old Capitol as a historical landmark through a marker installed on its walls on April 11, 2010.

History 
The Casa Real de Iloilo was originally a one-story stone building where the provincial government offices were located after its completion in 1869. Gov. Enrique Fajardo finished construction of the second story in 1873, with first-class wood and a galvanized iron roof. He was also the first governor to establish an official residence in what was at the time the biggest and most elegant provincial capitol in the Philippines. Two publications in Madrid hailed it as "the magnificent Casa Real" and "the best of its kind, the most commodious and largest in the Philippines."

On April 11, 1901, the U.S. Philippine Commission headed by William Howard Taft inaugurated the civil government of Iloilo and inducted Gen. Martin T. Delgado as the first provincial governor at the Casa Real. Seven years later, on December 27, 1907, Gov. Benito Lopez was assassinated in the same building. The Casa Real was renovated in 1910 and heavily damaged in World War II. A large annex was built after the war, but it was gutted by fire in 1998. 

In 1927, the flagstaff or flagpole gave way to the Arroyo Fountain in front of the building in honor of Senator Jose Maria Arroyo. The fountain also serves as the kilometre zero of Panay Island.

The building was declared a historical landmark in 2010 by the National Historical Commission of the Philippines. It was restored to its pristine grandeur in time for the 2015 Independence Day celebration. This paper tells the colorful 150-year story of the Casa Real de Iloilo, where 18 Spanish and 29 Filipino governors have held office.

The new Iloilo Provincial Capitol was constructed behind the building and was completed in 2006. Casa Real de Iloilo now mostly serves as a venue for private parties, government functions, and cultural events. Governors held their inaugural and induction ceremonies at the Old Capitol.

See also 

 Iloilo Provincial Capitol

References

External links 

Buildings and structures in Iloilo City
Tourist attractions in Iloilo City
Local government buildings in the Philippines